Slash is a 2016 American comedy film directed and written by Clay Liford. The film stars Michael Johnston, Hannah Marks, Michael Ian Black, Missi Pyle, Sarah Ramos, Peter Vack, Jessie Ennis, and Matt Peters.

Plot

Fifteen-year-old Neil Shafer is a nerd in high school whose secret passion is writing slash – amateur fiction that imagines erotic relationships between the two male characters of various TV and film series. His specialty is the book and film series Vanguard. Neil is greatly embarrassed when another student snatches the exercise book that contains his writings, and it is shown all around the school. It is picked up by Julia Jordan, who thinks it is hers. Neil and Julia discover a common interest in writing slash and quickly become best friends.

She urges Neil to publish his work on the fan fiction website The Rabbit Hole and he soon gains a following. At the same time, Neil is not sure about his own sexuality and whether he is gay or attracted to Julia. Julia pushes Neil to attend a special session held by the Rabbit Hole at a comic book convention, Comicpalooza, where they have been invited to come and read their works. Neil has also struck up a conversation with Denis, a gay fellow reader of his work, who urges him to meet up. Neil lies and says that he is eighteen years old to gain entry, but this causes problems when the truth is found out.

Cast 

 Michael Johnston as Neil
 Hannah Marks as Julia
 Jessie Ennis as Martine
 Peter Vack as Mike Holloway
 Missi Pyle as Ronnie
 Sarah Ramos as Marin
 Robert Longstreet as Blake
 Angela Kinsey as Anglaxia Supremacy IV
 Laura Bailey as Laylanath Inquisitrix VII
 Luciana Faulhaber as Luxalia Contendrax III 
 Liza Oppenheimer as Merculliax Pernicious IX 
 John Ennis as Deron Zaxa
 Lucas Neff as The Kragon
 Tishuan Scott as Vanguard
 Michael Ian Black as Denis
 Allie DeBerry as Jessie Hunt
 Burnie Burns as Mr. Snow
 Matt Peters as Mr. Ford
 Isaac Ireland as Nintendo DS Kid

Production 
Filming began in June 2015 in Austin. Producing by Brock Williams through Boxcar Films and Jason Wehling through Arts+Labor. The film had its world premiere at SXSW on March 13, 2016.

References

External links 
 
 
 

2016 films
LGBT-related drama films
Films shot in Austin, Texas
American comedy films
2016 comedy films
Gay-related films
2016 LGBT-related films
2010s English-language films
2010s American films